Alyaksey Dvaretski (born 17 December 1977) is a Belarusian professional football coach and former player.

External links

1977 births
Living people
Belarusian footballers
Belarusian expatriate footballers
Expatriate footballers in Poland
FC Dynamo Brest players
FC Smorgon players
FC Energetik-BGU Minsk players
Wigry Suwałki players
Belarusian football managers
FC Smorgon managers
Association football defenders
Place of birth missing (living people)